Monkey is a third wave ska band based in the San Francisco Bay Area. Their musical influences include the Skatalites, Prince Buster, the Specials, and non-ska artists such as: Elvis Costello, David Byrne and Tito Puente. Monkey has released five albums, the first two as independent releases, the next three by Asian Man Records. Their debut album ¡Changito!, was listed as San Jose's Best Independent Release for 1998. They have toured the United States, Canada, Mexico, Europe and the United Kingdom, and have earned several nominations and awards, including winning the California Music Award (Bammie) in 1999.

The band has gone on to tour the world and has recorded several albums. Monkey's music can be heard on several compilations, as well as movie and video game soundtracks.

History

Monkey was formed in the summer of 1995, by Curtis Meacham and Kevin Miller. In 1997 Monkey's first full-length release, ¡Changito!, was released. The lineup of the band changed numerous times after this, with Meacham and Miller remaining. In 1999, they won a Bay Area Music award, or Bammy. Their second self-released album, Station Wagon Living came out during the "crash" of third wave ska. Co-founding member Miller left the band in 2001. Meacham, up until then lead singer and organ player, became the band's lead guitarist. Monkey were signed in 2004, and released their first label supported album, Cruel Tutelage on Asian Man Records. While touring Europe, they met up with Bad Manners in the U.K. They returned to the U.S. and toured as their backup band. In 2009, they released Lost at Sea. The album featured Kincaid Smith from Hepcat on trumpet, and the artwork was supplied by Parker Jacobs of Yo Gabba Gabba fame.

Current lineup

Curtis Meacham: Vocals/Guitar
Micah Turney: Drums
Brian Lockrem: Trumpet
Dan Root: Saxophone
Gabe Jimenez: Bass

Previous members (partial list)

Aadith Srinivasan: Bass     (2016-2017)
Aaron Blanding: Trumpet     (1995–1996)
Adam Brioza: Guitar/Vocals  (1995–2001)
Allen Teboul: Drums         (1995–1996)
Bob Furber: Saxophone       (1997–1998) (R.I.P.)
Bob Wilms: Saxophone        (1999–2000)
Bobby Miller: Saxophone     (1998–1999)
Brandon DuVall: Saxophone   (2015–2016, 2019)
Dave Borton: Trombone       (1996-1997)
Dustin James: Tbone/Org/Vox
Donelle Cory Rippon: Bass   (2003–2006 & 2016)
Jimmy Boom: Drums           (1999–2001)
Jordan Schwarz: Bass        (2014-2016)
Kevin Miller: Bass/Vocals   (1995–2001)
Michael Merrill: Trumpet    (1997–1999)
Nikki Arias: trombone/flute (1996–1997)
Matt Kolb: Drums            (1998–1999)
Rudy Sermeno: Bass          (2007-2014)
Sherry Biondi: Euphonium    (1996-1997)
Todd Bryan: Bass            (2001–2003)

Special Guests (Non-Members)

John Roy of Unsteady appears on Station Wagon Living
Kincaid Smith of Hepcat appears on Lost At Sea
Michael Valladares of Critical Mass appears on ¡Changito! and Station Wagon Living
Roland Alphonso of The Skatalites performs the Tenor Sax solo on "Quemara" on the album ¡Changito!.

Discography

Awards and nominations

1997 Wammie Nomination, SF Weekly
1998 Wammie nomination, S.F. Weekly
1998 Bammie nomination (Bay Area Music Award)
1999 California Music (formerly Bammie) Award Winner for 'Outstanding Ska Artist'

External links
 Asian Man Records

References

American ska musical groups
Third-wave ska groups
Asian Man Records artists